The 2018 Bowling Green Falcons football team represented Bowling Green State University in the 2018 NCAA Division I FBS football season. The Falcons were led by third-year head coach Mike Jinks for the first seven games until he was fired and replaced by interim head coach Carl Pelini. They played their home games at Doyt Perry Stadium in Bowling Green, Ohio as members of the East Division of the Mid-American Conference. They finished the season 3–9, 2–6 in MAC play to finish in a tie for fourth place in the East Division.

On November 28, 2018, the Falcons hired Boston College offensive coordinator Scot Loeffler as the new head coach.

Previous season
The Falcons finished the 2017 season 2–10, 2–6 in MAC play to finish in fifth place in the East Division.

Preseason

Award watch lists
Listed in the order that they were released

Preseason media poll
The MAC released their preseason media poll on July 24, 2018, with the Falcons predicted to finish in fifth place in the East Division.

Schedule

Game summaries

at Oregon

Maryland

Eastern Kentucky

Miami (OH)

at Georgia Tech

at Toledo

Western Michigan

at Ohio

Kent State

at Central Michigan

at Akron

Buffalo

Players drafted into the NFL

References

Bowling Green
Bowling Green Falcons football seasons
Bowling Green Falcons football